The 1991 Maine Black Bears football team was an American football team that represented the University of Maine as a member of the Yankee Conference during the 1991 NCAA Division I-AA football season. In their second season under head coach Kirk Ferentz, the Black Bears compiled a 3–8 record (2–6 against conference opponents) and finished in a three-way tie for last place in the conference. Paul Capriotti and Brian Roche were the team captains.

Schedule

References

Maine
Maine Black Bears football seasons
Maine Black Bears football